Energy in Wales refers to the production of electricity in Wales.

Electricity production 
In 2018, the annual production of electricity in Wales was 30.2 TWh and consumed 14.9 TWh, which means that Wales generates twice as much electricity as it consumes and is a net exporter of electricity to England, Ireland and Europe. In the same year, 25% was from renewable sources, up from 22% in 2017. Electricity generation encompasses a broad mix of technologies including Coal (e.g. Aberthaw), Gas (e.g. Baglan Bay), Wind (Cefn Croes), hydro-electricity (Dinorwig), solar thermal/PV and biomass electricity.

Fossil fuels 
Fossil fuels are not renewables; historically, the economy of Wales has been driven by fossil fuels. The coal industry in Wales had reached large proportions by the end of the eighteenth century, and then further expanded to supply steam-coal for the steam vessels that were beginning to trade around the world. The Cardiff Coal Exchange set the world price for steam-coal and Cardiff became a major coal-exporting port. The South Wales Coalfield was at its peak in 1913 and was one of the largest coalfields in the world. In 2019 the percentage of electricity generated from coal was only 2% of total electricity generated. The last coal-fired power station in Wales was at Aberthaw, which finally closed its doors in March 2020.

The total capacity of electricity generated from fossil fuels was 7.4 GW and came from three sources:
 gas power (5.6 GW)
 coal (1.6 GW )
 diesel (0.2 GW)

Renewable energy 

In 2018, Wales generated more than 50% of its electricity consumption as renewable electricity, an increase from 19% in 2014. The Welsh Government set a target of 70% by 2030. In 2019, Wales was a net exporter of electricity. It produced 27.9 TWh of electricity while only consuming 14.7 TWh. The natural resource base for renewable energy is high by European standards, with the core sources being wind, wave, and tidal. Wales has a long history of renewable energy: in the 1880s, the first house in Wales with electric lighting powered from its own hydro-electric power station was in Plas Tan y Bwlch, Gwynedd. In 1963, the Ffestiniog Power Station was constructed, providing a large scale generation of hydroelectricity, and in November 1973, the Centre for Alternative Technology was opened in Machynlleth.

Renewable energy targets 

In 2017, the Welsh Government announced a target of meeting 70% of Wales’ electricity demand from Welsh renewable electricity sources by 2030. By 2018, Wales generated over 3,864 MW renewable energy from 68,728 projects. In 2021, the Welsh government said that more than half the country's energy needs were being met by renewable sources, 2 percent of which was from 363 hydropower projects.

Renewable energy projects

Swansea tidal lagoon 
In 2015 a tidal lagoon for Swansea Bay was proposed, to generate electricity. However, in June 2018, the UK Government withdrew support for the plan due to independent study showing it to be not viable.

In January 2023, plans of a new Swansea tidal lagoon project called "Blue Eden" emerged but this time fully funded by the private sector. It would include an electric battery manufacturing plant, battery storage facility, a tidal lagoon in Swansea Bay with a floating solar farm, data storage centre, a green hydrogen production facility, an oceanic and climate change research centre. The project could start within 18 months.

Morlais tidal stream 
The Morlais tidal stream project, on the west coast of Anglesey, could deliver a combined 40MW of renewable clean energy. £31 million was secured in 2022, for the first phase of construction, from the EU's European Regional Development fund via the Welsh Government.

References 

Economy of Wales
Industry in Wales